Route 291 is 55 km two-lane north/south highway in Quebec, Canada, which starts in Rivière-du-Loup at the junction of Route 132 just east of Autoroute 20 and ends in Saint-Honoré-de-Témiscouata at the junction of Route 185.

Towns along Route 291
 Rivière-du-Loup
 Saint-Arsène
 Saint-Épiphane
 Saint-François-Xavier-de-Viger
 Saint-Honoré-de-Témiscouata

See also
 List of Quebec provincial highways

References

External links 
 Provincial Route Map (Courtesy of the Quebec Ministry of Transportation) 
 Route 291 on Google Maps

291
Roads in Bas-Saint-Laurent
Transport in Rivière-du-Loup